CloudForge was a software-as-a-service product for application development tools and services, such as Git hosting, Subversion (SVN) hosting, issue trackers and Application Lifecycle Management. CloudForge was built on CollabNet’s cloud hosting and integration platform, acquired from Codesion.com in October 2010.

History

CloudForge was first released in beta on April 30, 2012 and then officially released on July 30, 2012. CloudForge was built upon Codesion.com, which was founded as CVSDude by Mark Bathie in Brisbane, Australia in 2002. The team relocated to Silicon Valley and renamed to Codesion.com in early 2010, and was acquired by CollabNet in Brisbane, California, in 2010.

Outages

At 18:30 EST, 21st Feb 2015, all Cloudforge sites, including the main site www.cloudforge.com went offline. Paid SVN repositories were not available as the sitewide maintenance overran by over 24 hours.

Sunset

On July 8, 2020, Digital.ai announced the sunset of the CloudForge product on October 1, 2020.

As announced all accounts were terminated as of October 1, 2020. Account-holders have not been reimbursed for time prepaid prior to the July 2020 announcement and emails to the company requesting refunds have been ignored.

References

External links
 Official website

Version control
Project hosting websites
Project management software
Software project management
Computing websites
Companies based in San Mateo County, California
Internet properties established in 2012